Sylvan Building, originally known as Central National Bank, is a historic commercial building located at Columbia, South Carolina. It was built in 1870, and is a three-story, brick Second Empire style building designed by Samuel Sloan. It features a slate-covered mansard roof.

It was added to the National Register of Historic Places in 1972.

References

Commercial buildings on the National Register of Historic Places in South Carolina
Second Empire architecture in South Carolina
Commercial buildings completed in 1870
Buildings and structures in Columbia, South Carolina
National Register of Historic Places in Columbia, South Carolina